Baron Willem Ewout van Asbeck (born August 5, 1956 in The Hague, South Holland) is a former field hockey player from the Netherlands, who was a member of the Dutch National Team that finished sixth in the 1984 Summer Olympics in Los Angeles. His brother Peter was also part of the Holland squad, that competed in California. Van Asbeck earned a total number of 108 caps, scoring eleven goals, in the years 1978-1984. After the LA Games he retired from international competition.

External links
 
 Dutch Hockey Federation

1956 births
Living people
Barons of the Netherlands
Dutch male field hockey players
Olympic field hockey players of the Netherlands
Field hockey players at the 1984 Summer Olympics
Field hockey players from The Hague
Ewout